The Democratic Social-Revolutionary Party of Cuba is a democratic socialist political party in Cuba. Although changes to the Cuban constitution in 1992 decriminalized the right to form political parties other than the Communist Party of Cuba, no parties are permitted to campaign or engage in public political activities on the island. Public engagements by party members are typically restricted to international gatherings of democratic socialist groups.

The main political aims of the PSRDC are to persuade the Cuban government to declare a political amnesty and to reinstall a sovereign National Constituent Assembly which the party believes was abandoned following Fulgencio Batista's coup d'état in 1952. They also call for more freedom in Cuba's state controlled press and an end to what they consider Cuba's human rights violations. The PSRDC is extremely critical of Fidel Castro and the Communist Party apparatus describing the present government as "unrepresentative of the ideals of the Cuban Revolution". The party also condemns the role of the United States in the region, requesting that both Cubans and Americans overcome the compulsion to compare the merits and shortfalls of each system, describing such dialogue as unconstructive.

See also

List of political parties in Cuba

References

External links

Essay by Jorge Valls on the goals of the party

Cuban nationalism
Political parties in Cuba
Socialist parties in Cuba
Opposition to Fidel Castro
Democratic socialist parties in North America
Social democratic parties in North America